The Painter and His Model is a 1925 French-German silent film directed by Jean Manoussi and starring Madeleine Erickson, Léon Mathot and Ginette Maddie.

The film's sets were designed by the art director Robert Neppach. Location shooting took place around Paris including at the Eiffel Tower and Austerlitz Station.

Cast
 Madeleine Erickson as Frau Bonard
 Léon Mathot as Charles Bonard
 Ginette Maddie as Mariette
 Genevieve Poirier as Marvelle
 Jean-Louis Allibert as Vincent

References

Bibliography
 Alfred Krautz. International directory of cinematographers, set- and costume designers in film, Volume 4. Saur, 1984.

External links

1925 films
Films of the Weimar Republic
German silent feature films
Films directed by Jean Manoussi
German black-and-white films
UFA GmbH films
Films shot in Paris
French black-and-white films
1920s German films